The 2020–21 season was the 87th season in the existence of AS Saint-Étienne and the club's 17th consecutive season in the top flight of French football. In addition to the domestic league, Saint-Étienne participated in this season's edition of the Coupe de France. The season covered the period from 25 July 2020 to 30 June 2021.

Players

First-team squad
As of 1 February 2021.

Out on loan

Transfers

In

Out

Pre-season and friendlies

Competitions

Overview

Ligue 1

League table

Results summary

Results by round

Matches
The league fixtures were announced on 9 July 2020.

Coupe de France

Statistics

Appearances and goals

|-
! colspan=14 style=background:#dcdcdc; text-align:center| Goalkeepers

|-
! colspan=14 style=background:#dcdcdc; text-align:center| Defenders

|-
! colspan=14 style=background:#dcdcdc; text-align:center| Midfielders

|-
! colspan=14 style=background:#dcdcdc; text-align:center| Forwards

|-
! colspan=14 style=background:#dcdcdc; text-align:center| Players transferred out during the season

Goalscorers

References

External links

AS Saint-Étienne seasons
Saint-Étienne